Earth Mover is the third studio album by Hard trance duo Cosmic Gate. It was released on September 18, 2006 in Germany.

Track listing
A Mile In My Shoes (Featuring Sir Adrian) – 7:18
I Feel Wonderful (AM 2 PM Edit) (Featuring Jan Johnston) – 4:38
Element Of Life – 5:59
Should've Known (Featuring Tiff Lacey) – 7:24  	 
Analog Feel – 6:15
A Day That Fades (Featuring Roxanne Emery) – 6:10
Bilingual (Break Beat Edit) – 4:09
Guess Who? (Featuring Wippenberg)– 6:38
Race Car Driver (Paddock Club Edit) (Featuring Alexander Perls) – 6:27
Consciousness – 6:57
Earth Mover – 6:00
This Is The Party (Featuring Jan Johnston) – 6:26	
Ultra Curve – 3:53

References

External links
 

2006 albums
Cosmic Gate albums
Black Hole Recordings albums